Long Ching Estate is a public housing estate in Yuen Long, New Territories, Hong Kong, near Tai Kiu Tsuen and within walking distance to MTR Long Ping station. It consists of two residential blocks completed in 2016.

History
Long Ching Estate was formerly the site of Yuen Long Estate, which had five buildings and was demolished in 2001. Originally, the Housing Authority planned to build three 32-storey blocks on the land. However, the Yuen Long District Council believed the land should be privately developed to boost the local economy. The government eventually divided the land in two, offering part of the site for private development of Yuccie Square.

Houses

Politics
Long Ching Estate is located in Yuen Long Tung Tau constituency of the Yuen Long District Council. It was formerly represented by Lam Ting-wai, who was elected in the 2019 elections until July 2021.

See also

Public housing estates in Yuen Long

References

Yuen Long Town
Public housing estates in Hong Kong
Residential buildings completed in 2016